Petropavlovka is a rural locality (a khutor) in Skororybskoye Rural Settlement, Podgorensky District, Voronezh Oblast, Russia. The population was 164 as of 2010. There are 4 streets.

Geography 
Petropavlovka is located 5 km southwest of Podgorensky (the district's administrative centre) by road, on the right bank of the Gnilaya Rossosh River. Malaya Sudyovka is the nearest rural locality.

References 

Rural localities in Podgorensky District